The Great Tang Treatise on Astrology of the Kaiyuan Era, also called the Kaiyuan Star Observations (Kaiyuan Zhanjing), is a Chinese astrology encyclopedia compiled by Gautama Siddha and a team of scholars between 714 and 724 AD during the Kaiyuan era of the Tang Dynasty. 

The book is divided into 120 volumes and consists of about 600,000 words. The Kaiyuan Zhanjing incorporates many fragments of other works, including the star catalogues of Shi Shen and Gan De and a translated version of Indian Navagraha calendar at chapter 104. It may have made use of the Yisizhan, compiled by Li Chunfeng around 645. Aryabhata's sine table by the eponymous Indian astronomer, was also translated into the Kaiyuan Zhanjing.

The Kaiyuan Zhanjing ceased to be copied in the 10th century, but was received attention from the scholar Cheng Mingshan in 1616 and was later included in the Siku Quanshu collections of the 18th century.

Notes

References

External links 
 Ancient Chinese Books and Records of Science and Technology (PDF)
8th-century works
Chinese astrology
Chinese prose texts
Astrological texts
Chinese encyclopedias
724
8th century in China
Treatises